FlordeLiza is a 2015 Philippine daytime television drama aired on ABS-CBN's Kapamilya Gold afternoon block and worldwide on The Filipino Channel from January 19, 2015, to August 28, 2015, replacing Kapamilya Blockbusters and was replaced by Doble Kara and All of Me.

Synopsis
Follow the story of Crisanto (Marvin Agustin), a soldier who went to other places to fight in a war about two groups with different beliefs. In the middle of his fight, he met Florida (Jolina Magdangal). Crisanto, who has a family to return to, didn't resist the temptation and had a child with Florida named Flor (Ashley Sarmiento). One day, the enemy's side surprisingly attacked Crisanto. To protect Flor from the war, he forced her to hide in their house. After the war, because of the wounds and bruises that Crisanto got, he was very ill and couldn’t move properly. Beth (Desiree Del Valle), Crisanto's wife, hired a helper to take care of Crisanto. She didn’t know, but she accidentally  hired Florida. She also didn’t know that Florida and Crisanto have had a child. Days after, Beth decides that Florida's child can live in their house. Beth and Crisanto's child, Liza (Rhed Bustamante), and Flor became bestfriends without knowing that Flor is her half- sister.

Cast and characters

Main cast
 Jolina Magdangal as Florida "Ida" Malubay-Magsakay — Crisanto's ex-mistress and Flor's mother.
 Marvin Agustin as Crisanto Maristela — Beth's husband and Ida's ex-lover.
 Desiree del Valle as Elizabeth "Beth" S. Perez-Maristela — Flor's stepmother and Liza's mother.
 Carlo Aquino as Arnold Magsakay — Florida's husband and Flor's stepfather.
 Ashley Sarmiento as Flor M. Maristela – Ida and Crisanto’s daughter, Arnold's stepdaughter, and Liza’s half-sister.
 Rhed Bustamante as Liza P. Maristela – Beth and Crisanto’s daughter, and Flor’s half-sister.

Supporting cast
 Elizabeth Oropesa as Lorena Sanchez-Perez — Beth's mother, Liza's grandmother.
 Tetchie Agbayani as Teresa Malubay — Florida's mother and Flor's grandmother.
 Juan Rodrigo as  Mariano "Nano" Perez — Beth's father, Liza's grandfather who is a lung cancer survivor.
 Tess Antonio as Annie — The rude, talkative, argumentative, and overly dramatic housemaid of the Maristela family.
 Joey Paras as Rona — Beth's best friend who constantly argues with Annie.
 Edward Mendez as Manuel "Manny" S. Perez — Beth's older brother who is jobless, lazy, and rude.
 Lemuel Pelayo as Jojo S. Perez — Beth's youngest brother.
 Johan Santos as Miguel Fontanillas — Crisanto's friend.
 Ronie "Atak" Arañia as Buslog Malubay — Teresa's adoptive son.
 Dionne Monsanto as Lynette Nacianceno-Perez — Manny's kindhearted wife.
 Lee Robin Salazar as Col. Francisco — Crisanto's best friend who was killed by the rebels.
 Debraliz Borres as Bebeng Magsakay — Arnold's aunt.
 Michael "Eagle" Riggs as Mama Wanda — Arnold's boss and the owner of the gay bar that Arnold works at. 
 Valerie Concepcion as Teacher Daisy C. Hizon — Flor and Liza's dance teacher who has an obsession over Flor and Crisanto. Recruits Liza into her plans by emotionally manipulating her into believing her parents love Flor more than her.
 Ricky Rivero as Lawrence "Lolei" Alcantara — Arnold's kindhearted customer from the gay bar who helps with his finances.
 Wilma  as Dalisay Sulta — The manager of Lolei's department store. 
 J. C. Santos as Jason — Arnold's workmate who despises him. 
 Marco Pingol as Travis Marquez — Flor and Liza's neighbor and friend.
 Bugoy Cariño as Luke Marquez — Travis' older brother, Flor and Liza's neighbor who is also their friend.
 Carlo Maceda as Gener De Jesus — Flor's friend who is special.
 JC Movido as Jenjen — Jason's special daughter.
 Juvy Lyn Bison as TBA — Manny and Lynette's daughter. 
 Miguelito de Guzman as TBA — Manny and Lynette's son.

Guest cast
 Kiko Matos as Cornelio Maristela — Crisanto's brother who joined the rebels.
 Arnold Reyes as Terrorist leader
 Nikki Valdez as Florida's friend
 Ya Chang as Mr. Chua — The financer of Teresa and Bebeng's store.
 Boom Labrusca as Luis Jacinto — One of Lolei's friends.
 Jan Marini as Joan Maristela — Cornelio's widower who has an ailing son.
 Candy Pangilinan as Coring Magsakay — RJ's rude wife who is a rent manager.
 Gerald Pizzaras as RJ Magsakay — Arnold's brother who attempted to molest Florida.
 Young JV as Dante — Lolei's friend.
 Francine Prieto as Atty. Grace Bruno — The lawyer helping Florida and Arnold get Flor's custody.
 Dante Ponce as Gen. Manuel Hizon — Daisy's father who killed by his wife.
 Yayo Aguila as Divina Cruz-Hizon — Daisy's mentally ill mother who killed her husband who later killed herself.
 Casey da Silva as young Daisy C. Hizon 
 Ricardo Cepeda as Benito Maristela — Crisanto's father.
 Rio Locsin as Imelda Maristela — Crisanto's mother.
 Jong Cuenco as Atty. Eric Gonzales — The Maristela family lawyer.
 Rubi Rubi as Corazon Aberion — The legal wife of Florida's father.
 Al Gatmaitan as Thomas — Daisy's friend.
 Carlos Morales as Congressman Santos — Daisy's boyfriend.

Reception

Scheduling
Initially meant to be part of ABS-CBN's PrimeTanghali noontime block, FlordeLiza was originally planned to replace Give Love on Christmas before It's Showtime. However, in a last minute change, the timeslot was moved to be part of ABS-CBN's Kapamilya Gold afternoon block. The timeslot was after It's Showtime. Oh My G! was the one who took the timeslot before It's Showtime. It was moved to ABS-CBN's PrimeTanghali noontime block instead of the Primetime Bida evening block which the original timeslot is before TV Patrol which was the original plan.

Awards and nominations
29th PMPC Star Awards for Television

 Best Daytime Drama - FlordeLiza (Nominated)
 Best Drama Actress - Jolina Magdangal (Nominated)
 Best Supporting Actor - Carlo Aquino (Nominated)
 Best Child Performer - Ashley Sarmiento (Nominated)

References

ABS-CBN drama series
Philippine drama television series
2015 Philippine television series debuts
2015 Philippine television series endings
Filipino-language television shows
Television shows set in the Philippines